Watton railway station was a station situated in Brecon, Powys, Wales. The station was opened by the Brecon and Merthyr Railway in 1863. It closed in 1871 when services were diverted to Brecon Free Street railway station.

References

Further reading

Disused railway stations in Powys
Former Brecon and Merthyr Tydfil Junction Railway stations
Railway stations in Great Britain opened in 1863
Railway stations in Great Britain closed in 1871